Rispah is the second album by the English band The Invisible,  released by Ninja Tune on 12 June 2012.

Reception

Upon the release, the album received favorable reviews. On the review aggregator Metacritic, the album has the score of 74 out of 100, based on 12 reviews by professional critics.

Track listing

References

2012 albums
The Invisible (band) albums